The 1991–92 West Midlands (Regional) League season was the 92nd in the history of the West Midlands (Regional) League, an English association football competition for semi-professional and amateur teams based in the West Midlands county, Shropshire, Herefordshire, Worcestershire and southern Staffordshire.

Premier Division

The Premier Division featured 17 clubs which competed in the division last season, along with two new clubs:
Cradley Town, promoted from Division One
Willenhall Town, relegated from the Southern Football League

League table

References

External links

1991–92
8